The Minnesota River is a tributary of the Mississippi River, approximately 332 miles (534 km) long, in the U.S. state of Minnesota.

It rises in southwestern Minnesota, in Big Stone Lake on the Minnesota–South Dakota border just south of the Laurentian Divide at the Traverse Gap portage. It flows southeast to Mankato, then turns northeast. It joins the Mississippi at Mendota south of the Twin Cities of Minneapolis and St. Paul, near the historic Fort Snelling. The valley is one of several distinct regions of Minnesota. The name Minnesota comes from the Dakota language phrase, "Mnisota Makoce" which is translated to "land where the waters reflect the sky", as a reference to the many lakes in Minnesota rather than the cloudiness of the actual river. At times, the native variant form "Minisota River" is used. For over a century prior to the organization of the Minnesota Territory in 1849, the name St. Pierre (St. Peter) had been generally applied to the river by French and English explorers and writers.  Minnesota River is shown on the 1757 edition of Mitchell Map as "Ouadebameniſsouté [Watpá Mnísota] or R. St. Peter".  On June 19, 1852, acting upon a request from the Minnesota territorial legislature, the United States Congress decreed the aboriginal name for the river, Minnesota, to be the river’s official name and ordered all agencies of the federal government to use that name when referencing it.

The valley that the Minnesota River flows in is up to five miles (8 km) wide and 250 feet (80 m) deep. It was carved into the landscape by the massive glacial River Warren between 11,700 and 9,400 years ago at the end of the last ice age in North America.  Pierre-Charles Le Sueur was the first European known to have traveled along the river. The Minnesota Territory, and later the state, were named for the river.

Commercial significance
The river valley is notable as the origin and center of the canning industry in Minnesota. In 1903 Carson Nesbit Cosgrove, an entrepreneur in Le Sueur presided at the organizational meeting of the Minnesota Valley Canning Company (later renamed Green Giant). By 1930, the Minnesota River valley had emerged as one of the country's largest producers of sweet corn. Green Giant had five canneries in Minnesota in addition to the original facility in Le Sueur.  Cosgrove's son, Edward, and grandson, Robert also served as heads of the company over the ensuing decades before the company was acquired by General Mills. Several docks for barges exist along the river. Farm grains, including corn, are transported to the ports of Minneapolis and Saint Paul, and then shipped down the Mississippi River.

Tributaries

Cities and towns

See also
 List of Minnesota rivers
 List of crossings of the Minnesota River
 Minnesota Valley (disambiguation)

Notes and references

Sources
 
Waters, Thomas F. (1977).  The Streams and Rivers of Minnesota.  Minneapolis: University of Minnesota Press.  .
Place Names: the Minnesota River

External links

Drainage Area of the Minnesota River
History of the Minnesota River Valley
Minnesota River at Mankato - pictures and more information
Minnesota River Basin Data Center - center at Minnesota State University, Mankato

 
Regions of Minnesota
Valleys of Minnesota
Rivers of Minnesota
Tributaries of the Mississippi River
Rivers of Big Stone County, Minnesota
Rivers of Blue Earth County, Minnesota
Rivers of Brown County, Minnesota
Rivers of Carver County, Minnesota
Rivers of Chippewa County, Minnesota
Rivers of Dakota County, Minnesota
Rivers of Hennepin County, Minnesota
Rivers of Lac qui Parle County, Minnesota
Rivers of Le Sueur County, Minnesota
Rivers of Nicollet County, Minnesota
Rivers of Ramsey County, Minnesota
Rivers of Redwood County, Minnesota
Rivers of Renville County, Minnesota
Rivers of Scott County, Minnesota
Rivers of Sibley County, Minnesota
Rivers of Swift County, Minnesota
Rivers of Yellow Medicine County, Minnesota